Lèves is a commune in the Eure-et-Loir department in Northern France.

Population

International relations
Lèves is twinned with the English town of Nailsworth, Gloucestershire.

See also
Communes of the Eure-et-Loir department
Bernard Jumentier

References

Communes of Eure-et-Loir